Kuşluca can refer to:

 Kuşluca, Erdemli
 Kuşluca, Karaçoban